Engina corinnae is a species of sea snail, a marine gastropod mollusk in the family Pisaniidae.

Description

Distribution

References

External links

Pisaniidae
Gastropods described in 1971